Iran participated in the 2010 Asian Para Games in Guangzhou, China on 13–19 December 2010. 156 athletes represented Iran in the first Asian Para Games. Shahabeddin Bassamtabar was the flag bearer for Iran in the opening ceremony.

Competitors

Medal summary

Medal table

Medalists

Results by event

Archery

Men's recurve

Men's compound

Women's recurve

Women's compound

Athletics

Men

Women

Boccia

Open

Cycling

Men's road

Men's track

Mixed road

Mixed track

Football 5-a-side

Men

Football 7-a-side

Men

Goalball

Men

Women

Judo

Men

Powerlifting

Men

Shooting

Men

Women

Mixed

Sitting volleyball

Men

Women

Swimming

Men

Table tennis

Men

Women

Wheelchair tennis

Men

References

External links
 2010 Asian Para Games official website

Asian Para Games
Nations at the 2010 Asian Para Games
Iran at the Asian Para Games